A Piłsudskiite was a political supporter of Marshal Józef Piłsudski, the founder of the First World War Polish Legions and the first Chief of State of the Second Republic of Poland. The Piłsudskiites had a major influence on Polish politics in the interwar period (1918–1939).

History
Piłsudski was the dominant political figure in the interwar Second Polish Republic. Most of the successive governments supported Pilsudski, who served as Chief of State from 1918 to 1922 and as Prime Minister from 1926 to 1928 and for several months in 1930. Piłsudski was highly influential, never dropped out of public life, remained active in Polish politics and exercised considerable influence until his death in May 1935. His special position was highlighted by the position of the General Inspector of the Armed Forces, which was created specifically for him and was not answerable to the Sejm (Parliament) but only to the President.

In May 1926, Piłsudskiite forces conducted the May Coup, deposed the legally-elected government and installed their own. The Sanacja political camp was formed, and Piłsudski's power grew. The Sanacja began to strengthen its own power and to curb the activities of opposition political parties. Many parties in that time became Piłsudskiite to get closer to power and stay safe from potential problems.

When Piłsudski died in May 1935, the Sanacja movement lost its leader. The political situation in Poland became radicalised, and the pressure of opposition camps on the ruling Sanacja (especially by the right-wing National Democracy) became stronger. To unite the Piłsudskiites and hold on to power, the leading Piłsudskiite politicians formed the Camp of National Unity.

To gain voters from the opposition National Democracy, the Camp of National Unity radicalised its program and even took some issues from the opposition camp such as becoming more nationalist. Still, it advocated Piłsudski's points of view and followed his political heritage.

See also
Józef Piłsudski's cult of personality
Piłsudski's colonels

Józef Piłsudski
Second Polish Republic
Eponymous political ideologies
Political movements